"Novembre" is a song by Italian pop singer Giusy Ferreri, released as second single from her debut album Gaetana. It was written by Roberto Casalino and produced by Tiziano Ferro.

The song was released digitally on 17 October 2008 in Italy, Austria, Netherlands, Belgium, Germany and other European countries. It debuted at the number one spot on the Italian charts.

Music video 
The music video for "Novembre" was directed by Cosimo Alemà, who was also the director of "Non ti scordar mai di me", and was filmed on 9–10 October 2008 in Paris. The video premiered on 27 October 2008 on Fox Life Italy and the song has been used for the official Italian advertising of the fifth season of the American television series Desperate Housewives.

In the video Giusy Ferreri is chased by a man in Paris, but later she discovers that he was her neighbour.

Formats and track listings

Digital single

 “Novembre" 3.09

Charts

References

2008 singles
Giusy Ferreri songs
Italian-language songs
Number-one singles in Italy
Songs written by Roberto Casalino
2008 songs
Sony BMG singles